Eric Sell, better known as EES (also: eesy-ees/EeS/EeS, "Easy Eric Sell"), is a German Namibian Kwaito artist and rapper.

Sell was born in Windhoek on 5 October 1983. He  lives both in Windhoek, Namibia's capital, and Cologne, Germany. His texts are written in a mixture of Afrikaans and English. He also makes frequent use of Namlish and Namibian German (Südwesterdeutsch), the German dialect spoken in Namibia, and he popularised the term Nam-Slang for it.

Awards

Won
2008 Sanlam NBC Music Awards: Best Rock/Alternative Artist
2009 MTV Africa Music Awards: Listener Choice Award
2009 Namibian Music Awards: Artist of the Year
2011 Namibian Annual Music Awards: Best international achievement
2012 Namibian Annual Music Awards: Best Music Video & Best Collaboration
2012 Channel O Music Video Awards: Best Kwaito Video ("Ayoba" with Mandoza)

Discography
 2002 – Straight from NAM
 2003 – Bio-Lyrical Warfare (only South Africa)
 2003 – Yes-Ja (Das Album)
 2004 – Odyssey Cru
 2004 – 061 for LIFE!
 2005 – Wo is die Coolbox?
 2006 – NAM FlaVa!
 2007 – Sharp, Sharp!
 2008 – Awee!
 2011 – Megaphone Ghazzie
 2012 – The Remixes (Raw & Unmastered)
 2012 – Da Gehn Wir (feat. T-zon)
 2013 – IF Not, Why Not!
 2014 – Authentic Rebel (feat. M-Poser Boss)

Films and books
The Kwaito-Documentary
Esisallesoreidt (approximately: EverythingIsAllRight), a humorous dictionary Südwesterdeutsch–German

References

External links
EES | Afro Lifestyle Music Sound
YES-JA!“ Die KWAITO Documentary - Blog | Museke 
Nix für Sprachpuristen: „Esisallesoreidt“

1983 births
Living people
Kwaito musicians
Namibian hip hop musicians
21st-century Namibian male singers
Musicians from Windhoek